

The Davis DA-5, a.k.a. DA-5A, is a single-seat sport aircraft designed in the United States in the 1970s and marketed for homebuilding. Like designer Leeon D. Davis's successful DA-2, it is a low-wing monoplane with fixed tricycle undercarriage and a V-tail, but with a much narrower fuselage accommodating only the pilot, and a lengthened nose. Design work was carried out in 1972, but the prototype was not built until 1974, when it was completed in only 67 days.

Specifications

References

External links 
Source for plans and information on the Davis DA-5 http://davisda2.com

1970s United States sport aircraft
Davis aircraft
Homebuilt aircraft
Low-wing aircraft
V-tail aircraft
Single-engined tractor aircraft
Aircraft first flown in 1974